The Best Of is a 2-CD compilation album by the band Motörhead, released in August 2000 on the Sanctuary Records subsidiary label Metal-Is.

Recording
The Best Of includes 37 Motörhead tracks spanning the band's career from 1977 to 2000, including four previously unreleased live tracks recorded in 1981. It also includes three non-Motörhead tracks: Girlschool's cover version of Motörhead's "Bomber", a cover version of Johnny Kidd & The Pirates' "Please Don't Touch" performed by the Motörhead/Girlschool collaboration Headgirl, and Hawkwind's original version of "Motörhead", the song from which Motörhead frontman Lemmy took the band's name after being fired from Hawkwind. 14 of Motörhead's then-16 studio albums are represented, with March ör Die (1992) and Bastards (1993) excluded.

Track listing

NOTE: The live recordings where later featured on the re-release 40th anniversary edition of No Sleep 'til Hammersmith in 2021.

Charts

Certifications

References

Motörhead compilation albums
2000 greatest hits albums
Sanctuary Records compilation albums